Decatur United Methodist Church is a historic church on Vernon Street in Decatur, Tennessee. It is one of nine active United Methodist churches affiliated with the Meigs County United Methodist Parish.

The church building was built in 1859 and added to the National Register of Historic Places in 1982.

References

External links
 Decatur United Methodist Church

Methodist churches in Tennessee
Churches on the National Register of Historic Places in Tennessee
Carpenter Gothic church buildings in Tennessee
Churches completed in 1859
19th-century Methodist church buildings in the United States
Buildings and structures in Meigs County, Tennessee
National Register of Historic Places in Meigs County, Tennessee